The 98th Milano–Torino cycling classic was held on 5 October 2017 over a distance of , between San Giuliano Milanese and Turin. The race was rated as a 1.HC event on the 2017 UCI Europe Tour and was won by Colombian rider Rigoberto Urán of the  team.

Teams
Nineteen teams of up to eight riders started the race:

Result

References

2017 UCI Europe Tour
2017 in Italian sport
Milano–Torino